Juraphyllites is a genus of ammonites belonging to the family Juraphyllitidae.

Fossil record
These ammonites lived in the Jurassic from Sinemurian to Toarcian (age range: 196.5 to 182.0 million years ago). Fossils of this genus can be found in Argentina, Austria, Canada, Chile, China, France, Germany, Hungary, Italy, Morocco, Portugal, Slovakia, Spain, Tunisia, Turkey and United States.

Species
Species within this genus include:
 Juraphyllites (Harpophylloceras) eximius Hauer 1854
 Juraphyllites (Meneghiniceras) lariense Meneghini 1875
 Juraphyllites diopsis Gemmellaro 1884
 Juraphyllites gigas Fucini 1901
 Juraphyllites helveticus Wiedenmayer 1977
 Juraphyllites libertus Gemmellaro 1884
 Juraphyllites libertus australis Hillebrandt 2006
 Juraphyllites limatus Rosenberg 1909
 Juraphyllites mimatensis d'Orbigny 1844
 Juraphyllites nardii Meneghini 1853
 Juraphyllites planispira Reynes 1868
 Juraphyllites planispiroides Rakus 1994
 Juraphyllites separabilis Fucini 1901

See also
List of ammonite genera

References

Ammonitida genera
Phylloceratina